Darren Toby (born January 18, 1982 in Lowlands) is a Trinidadian footballer who plays for Rochester Lancers 2 in Major Arena Soccer League 2.

Career

College and Amateur
Toby attended St. Clairs Coaching School in Tobago, where he was named the school league MVP in 2001, and prepped at Signal Hill where he served as team captain from 2001-2002. Was named MVP of the Tobago Futbol league in 2001 before coming to the United States to attend college in 2003.

He played college soccer at University of Mobile in 2003, where he was named a NAIA Third-Team All-American, before transferring to the College of Charleston in his sophomore year.

Professional
Undrafted out of college, Toby signed with the Charlotte Eagles in the USL Second Division in 2008. He made his professional debut on April 19, 2008, in Charlotte's 2008 season opener against Bermuda Hogges. He re-signed for a fourth season with Charlotte on December 6, 2010. 

Toby returned to the Rochester Lancers in January 2023 to play for their Major Arena Soccer League 2 team.

References

External links
 Charlotte Eagles bio
 College of Charleston bio

1982 births
Living people
Trinidad and Tobago footballers
Trinidad and Tobago expatriate footballers
College of Charleston Cougars men's soccer players
Charlotte Eagles players
Syracuse Silver Knights players
VSI Tampa Bay FC players
University of Mobile alumni
Expatriate soccer players in the United States
USL Second Division players
USL Championship players
Major Indoor Soccer League (2008–2014) players
National Premier Soccer League players
Association football midfielders
Major Arena Soccer League players
Utica City FC players